Margaret Louise Carter (née Hunter; December 29, 1935) is an American politician who was a Democratic member of the Oregon Legislative Assembly from 1985 to 1999 and 2001 to 2009 and was the first black woman elected to the state's legislature.  She served in the Oregon House of Representatives until 1999, and then in the Oregon State Senate from 2001 to 2009. She served as President Pro Tempore of the Senate, Vice Chair for Ways and Means, and as a member of both the Health and Human Services and Oregon State Hospital Patient Care committees. She announced her resignation from the Senate effective August 31, 2009, and took a post as Deputy Director for Human Services Programs at the Oregon Department of Human Services. In 2015, she was reportedly considering a return to the senate.

Early life
Born Margaret Hunter in Shreveport, Louisiana, on December 29, 1935, her parents were Hilton and Emma Hunter. She was raised there in a family of nine children by her father, a Baptist minister, and her mother, a cook at the school cafeteria. After earning the honor as salutatorian in high school, she received scholarships to Grambling State University where she then briefly attended before meeting who would become her first husband. After getting married she had five daughters by the age of 28, but moved to Oregon to escape abuse by her then husband. She arrived via train on December 1, 1967, and began working odd jobs. In Oregon, she re-married, adding four stepchildren, but divorced after a few years to Elvis. In 1970, she enrolled at Portland State University where she then graduated from in 1972 with a bachelor of arts degree in education. Carter then earned a masters of education in psychology from Oregon State University in 1973. In 1973, Carter began working for Portland Community College as a counselor.

Political career
Republican leaders recruited Carter to run for a seat in the Oregon House of Representatives in 1983. They hoped to unseat the incumbent in a heavily Democratic district in Northeast Portland. Carter won as a Democrat in 1984 and began serving at the 1985 legislative session representing District 18. She became the first African-American woman elected to the Oregon Legislative Assembly. In the House she worked to pass legislation that ended state controlled investments in South Africa during apartheid and legislation to observe Martin Luther King Jr.'s birthday as a state holiday. In 1989 she advocated for Blacks to join the Urban League of Portland.

In 1998, she was a candidate for the office of Oregon Superintendent of Public Instruction, but lost to Stan Bunn. Carter was a member of the Oregon House until January 1999, when term limits prevented her from seeking additional terms. In November 1999, she became the president of the Urban League of Portland, serving until May 2002. Also in 1999 she retired from Portland Community College. She was then elected to the Senate in November 2000. In 2005, she became president pro tempore of the Oregon State Senate and was unopposed in the 2008 election.

In 2010, she was awarded the Legislator of the Year Award from the Oregon Library Association.

Later life
She resigned from the Oregon Senate in 2009 in order to take a job at the Oregon Department of Human Services.  The hiring was criticized since the new position paid $121,872 annually, which, along with other similar moves to the public sector by other legislators, led to the introduction of several bills to curtail such practices. None of the bills ever became law. Carter became director of community engagement in 2012 and saw her salary decreased.

See also 
 Seventy-third Oregon Legislative Assembly (2005–2006)
 Seventy-fourth Oregon Legislative Assembly (2007–2008)
 Seventy-fifth Oregon Legislative Assembly (2009–2010)

References

External links
 Follow the Money - Margaret Carter
 2006 2004 2000 1998 1996 1994 1992 1990 campaign contributions

 Margaret Carter Oral History Interview

1935 births
Living people
African-American state legislators in Oregon
African-American women in politics
Democratic Party Oregon state senators
Oregon State University alumni
Democratic Party members of the Oregon House of Representatives
Portland State University alumni
Grambling State University alumni
Women state legislators in Oregon
Portland Community College alumni
21st-century American politicians
21st-century American women politicians
African-American history of Oregon
21st-century African-American women
21st-century African-American politicians
20th-century African-American people
20th-century African-American women